Highway 394, also known as the Patience Lake Road, is an unsigned highway in the Canadian province of Saskatchewan. It starts near an intersection between Highway 16 and Zimmerman Road (Range Road 3044) near Saskatoon, and goes eastward to Highway 316 north of Clavet.

References

394